Peripatoides suteri is a species of velvet worm in the Peripatopsidae family. This species is ovoviviparous, has 16 pairs of legs, and is endemic to New Zealand. These velvet worms range in size from 14 mm to 90 mm.

Conservation 

This species is listed as Vulnerable on the IUCN Red List.

References 

Animals described in 1900
Endemic fauna of New Zealand
IUCN-assessed onychophorans
Onychophorans of Australasia
Onychophoran species
Taxa named by Arthur Dendy
Taxonomy articles created by Polbot
Worms of New Zealand
Endemic worms of New Zealand